Daram may refer to:
 Daram, Mazandaran, Iran (درام - Darām)
 Daram, Zanjan, Iran (درم - Daram)
 Daram, Samar, Philippines
 SS Daram, an American cargo ship that ran aground on Long Bar Reef, Bermuda

See also
 Daram Rud, Kurdistan, a village in Sursur Rural District, Muchesh District, Kamyaran County, Kurdistan Province, Iran